Woomelang is a town in the Mallee region of Victoria, Australia.

As with most towns in the Mallee region, the main industry is dryland agriculture and woolgrowing.  The population has been slowly declining, from 290 at the 1981 census to 211 people in 2001, 195 in 2006, and 191 in 2011.

Woomelang Post Office opened on 10 August 1900.

Woomelang Magistrates' Court closed on 1 May 1981, having not been visited by a Magistrate since 1971.

An interesting attraction to the south of Woomelang is a shearing shed constructed during World War II.  Due to wartime shortages, the shed is made of compacted kerosene tins.

With its neighbouring township Lascelles, Woomelang had a football team (Woomelang-Lascelles) competing in the Mallee Football League, until the league folded at the end of the 2015 season. Golfers play at the course of the Woomelang Golf Club on Sunraysia Highway.

References

External links

Woomelang Website – Official site
Yarriambiack Shire Council – Official site
Travelmate tourist site

Towns in Victoria (Australia)
Mallee (Victoria)